Inishgort (Gaeilge: Inis Goirt) is an island in Clew Bay, County Mayo. Inishgort is home to Inishgort lighthouse, originally opened in 1806.

Demographics

References

Islands of County Mayo
Geography of County Mayo